Lark's tongue may refer to:

 Lark's tongue (chamfer), a special type of chamfer end.
 Larks' Tongues in Aspic, a 1973 album by King Crimson
Larks' Tongues in Aspic (instrumental), a series of pieces by that band, the first two of which appear on the album of the same name
 the tongue of a lark, which was used in ancient recipes